Scott Thomas Miller (born July 31, 1997) is an American football wide receiver for the Tampa Bay Buccaneers of the National Football League (NFL). He played college football at Bowling Green and was drafted by the Buccaneers in the sixth round of the 2019 NFL Draft.

Early life 
Miller was born and raised in Barrington, Illinois. He was a star football player at Barrington High School, graduating in 2015. He was regarded as a two-star recruit coming out of high school. He also had personal bests of 10.53 in the 100M, and 21.25 in the 200M in track and field.

He committed to play for Bowling Green on November 11, 2014 over offers from North Dakota State and South Dakota State.

College career 

Miller graduated from Bowling Green State University in 2019.

Professional career

Miller was drafted by the Tampa Bay Buccaneers in the sixth round, 208th overall, of the 2019 NFL Draft. The Buccaneers acquired the selection used on Miller in a trade that sent DeSean Jackson to the Philadelphia Eagles. Miller's 40-yard dash was clocked as low as 4.2s and as high as 4.39 at his Pro Day.

2019 season
In Week 15, during a 38–17 win against the Detroit Lions, Miller caught three passes for 49 yards and his first career touchdown but injured his hamstring and left the game. On December 17, 2019, Miller was placed on injured reserve.

Miller finished his rookie season with 13 catches for 200 yards and one touchdown as well as two rushes for 18 yards.

2020 season
In Week 4 against the Los Angeles Chargers, Miller recorded five catches for 83 yards and his first touchdown of the season, his first from new quarterback Tom Brady, during the 38–31 win. In Week 7 against the Las Vegas Raiders, Miller recorded six catches for 109 receiving yards and a touchdown for his first professional 100-yard game. Overall, Miller finished the 2020 season with 33 receptions for 501 receiving yards and three receiving touchdowns.

In the NFC Championship against the Green Bay Packers, Miller recorded a 39 yard touchdown reception at the end of the first half during the 31–26 win. Miller had one rush for −3 yards in Super Bowl LV against the Kansas City Chiefs, which the Buccaneers won, earning Miller his first Super Bowl ring.

2021 season 
On September 29, 2021, Miller was placed on injured reserve with turf toe. He was activated on November 23.

2022 season 
Miller played 15 games for a total of 185 yards for the 2022 season.

NFL career statistics

Regular season

Postseason

Personal life
Miller is a Christian. He is married to Jenna Rizkalla.

References

External links
Tampa Bay Buccaneers bio
Bowling Green State Falcons bio

1997 births
Living people
American football wide receivers
Bowling Green Falcons football players
People from Barrington, Illinois
Players of American football from Illinois
Sportspeople from the Chicago metropolitan area
Sportspeople from Cook County, Illinois
Tampa Bay Buccaneers players